Hugues Legault (born January 14, 1974) is a former freestyle swimmer who represented Canada at the 1996 Summer Olympics in Atlanta, Georgia.  Legeault competed in the preliminary heats of the men's 50-metre freestyle, but did not advance.  He finished 39th overall in a field of 64.

Legeault is the older brother of swimmer Karine Legault, who competed at the 2000 Summer Olympics.

References
sports-reference

1974 births
Living people
Canadian male freestyle swimmers
Olympic swimmers of Canada
Swimmers from Montreal
Swimmers at the 1996 Summer Olympics